List of people with the surnames Macaulay, MacAulay, and McAulay.

People with the surname

Macaulay
 Alastair Macaulay, chief dance critic of the New York Times
 Angus Macaulay (1759–1827), schoolmaster, physician and political figure in Prince Edward Island, Canada
 Archie Macaulay (1915–1993), Scottish football player and manager
 Aulay Macaulay (disambiguation), several people
 Aulay Macaulay, (died 1788), English inventor of a system of shorthand
 Aulay MacAulay of Ardincaple (died 1617), Scottish laird, clan chief, shire Commissioner, and knight
 Catharine Macaulay (1731–1791), English historian
 Colin Macaulay (1760–1836) Slavery abolitionist and campaigner
 David Macaulay (born 1946), American author and illustrator
 Eunice Macaulay (1923–2013), British-born animator and filmmaker
 Francis Sowerby Macaulay (1862–1937), English mathematician
 Frederick Macaulay (1882–1970), economist of the Institutionalist School
 Genevieve Macaulay (1880–1938), American philanthropist and Papal duchess
 George Macaulay (1897–1940), English cricketer
 George Campbell Macaulay (1852–1915), Classical scholar of Herodotus
 Herbert Macaulay (1864–1946), Nigerian politician
 Helene Macaulay (born 1961), celebrity makeup artist
 James Macaulay (Canadian physician) (1759–1822), doctor and medical official in Upper Canada
 James Buchanan Macaulay (1793–1859), Canadian lawyer
 John Macaulay (politician) (1792–1857), political figure in Upper Canada
 John Simcoe Macaulay (1791–1855), another political figure in Upper Canada
 Kenneth Macaulay (politician) (1815–1867), English politician
 Kenneth Macaulay (colonialist) (1792–1829), colonial official in Sierra Leone
 Kyle Macaulay (born 1986), Scottish professional footballer
 Leopold Macaulay (1887–1979), Canadian politician
 Marc Macaulay (born 1948), American actor
 Michael Macaulay (born 1939), South African cricketer
 Neill W. Macaulay, Jr. (1935–2007), American writer, professor and Cuban revolutionary
 Reginald Macaulay (1858–1937), English footballer
 Robert Macaulay (1921-2010), Canadian politician
 Robert Devin Macaulay (born 1989), American Engineer
 Robertson Macaulay (1833–1915), Canadian insurance company executive
 Rose Macaulay (1881–1958), English novelist
 Sarah Jane Macaulay (born 1963) aka Sarah Brown, wife of former UK prime minister Gordon Brown
 Thomas Babington Macaulay (1800–1859), 1st Baron Macaulay, "Lord Macaulay", English poet, historian and Whig politician
 Thomas Bassett Macaulay (1860–1942), Canadian actuary and philanthropist
 Tony Macaulay (born 1944), English songwriter
Tony Macaulay (writer) (born 1963), Northern Irish author, management consultant and peace builder
 Vince Macaulay (born 1961), head coach and owner of British Basketball League franchise Milton Keynes Lions
 Zachary Macaulay (1768–1838), Scottish colonial governor

MacAulay
 Alexander McAulay (1863–1931), first professor of mathematics and physics at the University of Tasmania
 Fred MacAulay (born 1956), Scottish comedian
 John MacAulay, Canadian lawyer and Red Cross activist
 Lawrence MacAulay, Canadian politician
 Michael Darragh MacAulay, Irish Gaelic Footballer

McAulay
Alex McAulay (born 1977), American novelist
Greg McAulay (born 1960), Canadian World champion curler
James McAulay (1860–1943), Scottish footballer
John McAulay, (1888–1956), Scottish soldier, recipient of the Victoria Cross
Terry McAulay, American football official
William McAulay (1879-1935), Scottish footballer

See also
List of people with surnames MacCauley or McCauley

Macaulay